The Great American Conference (GAC) is a college athletic conference affiliated with the National Collegiate Athletic Association (NCAA) at the Division II level, with headquarters located in Russellville, Arkansas. Athletic competition began play during the 2011–12 school year. Its twelve all-sports member schools are located in Arkansas and Oklahoma in the South Central United States. In addition, the conference has four affiliate members in men's soccer, two of which are in Kansas.

History

The conference's charter members previously competed in the Lone Star Conference (East Central University, Southeastern Oklahoma State University and Southwestern Oklahoma State University) and the Gulf South Conference (Arkansas Tech University, University of Arkansas at Monticello, Harding University, Henderson State University, Ouachita Baptist University and Southern Arkansas University) before forming the GAC in 2010. The new conference is intended to reduce travel costs for its member universities.

On May 11, 2011, the conference invited Northwestern Oklahoma State and Southern Nazarene University to the conference for the 2012–13 academic year. Those universities continued to compete in the Sooner Athletic Conference during the 2011–12 season before joining the conference.

As of July 11, 2014, the NCAA Division II Membership Committee recommended the membership application for Oklahoma Baptist University to set up the move from the NAIA to NCAA Division II and it joined the conference for the 2015–16 season.

The GAC and the Mid-America Intercollegiate Athletics Association (MIAA) announced a partnership in June 2018 to combine their men’s tennis and men’s soccer leagues in both sports from the 2019–20 academic year. Under the agreement, the MIAA will organize the tennis league and the GAC will organize the soccer.

Chronological timeline
 2011 - The Great American Conference (GAC) was founded. Charter members included six schools from the state of Arkansas (Arkansas Tech University, the University of Arkansas at Monticello, Harding University, Henderson State University, Ouachita Baptist University and Southern Arkansas University from the Gulf South Conference); and three schools from the state of Oklahoma (East Central University, Southeastern Oklahoma State University and Southwestern Oklahoma State from the Lone Star Conference), effective beginning the 2011-12 academic year.
 2012 - Northwestern Oklahoma State University and Southern Nazarene University joined the GAC, effective in the 2012-13 academic year.
 2015 - Oklahoma Baptist University joined the GAC, effective in the 2015-16 academic year.
 2015 - Oklahoma Christian University and Rogers State University joined the GAC as affiliate members for men's and women's outdoor track & field outdoor, effective in the 2016 spring season (2015-16 academic year).
 2019 - Oklahoma Christian and Rogers State left the GAC as affiliate members for men's and women's outdoor track & field outdoor, effective after the 2019 spring season (2018-19 academic year).
 2019 - Fort Hays State University, Newman University and Northeastern State joined the GAC as affiliate members for men's soccer (with Rogers State re-joining for that sport), effective in the 2019 fall season (2019-20 academic year).

Member schools

Current members
The GAC currently has 12 full members, all but four are public schools:

Affiliate members
The GAC currently has four affiliate members, all but one are public schools:

Notes

Former affiliate members
The GAC had two former affiliate members, one was a private school and one was a public school. Both affiliate members left the GAC after the 2018–19 school year, as each joined a conference that sponsors the sports that it housed in the GAC.

Notes

Membership timeline

Sports
The GAC sponsors championships in seven men's and eight women's sports.

Men's sponsored sports by school

Women's sponsored sports by school

Other sponsored sports by school

Awards

Scholar-Athlete of the Year
The male and female scholar-athlete of the year awards are voted upon by the league's faculty athletic representatives or designees.

Athlete of the Year
The male and female athlete of the year awards are voted upon by the league's sports information directors or designees.

All-Sports Trophy

The All-Sports Trophy is presented to the athletic department with the highest point total at the end of the athletic year. Points are recorded in all sponsored sports with six or more participants. The regular season standings will determine the points for the sports of baseball, men's basketball, women's basketball, football, women's soccer, softball, women's tennis, and volleyball. The conference championship will determine the points for the sports of men's cross country, women's cross country, men's golf, and women's golf.

NACDA Learfield Sports Directors' Cup Rankings
The NACDA Learfield Sports Directors' Cup is an annual award given by the National Association of Collegiate Directors of Athletics to the U.S. colleges and universities with the most success in collegiate athletics.

Conference Champions

Current champions

Fall 2016

Winter 2016–17

Spring 2017

Total conference championships
Total conference postseason championships and football regular season championships won by each school.

Facilities

National Championships

NCAA Division II
Team and individual titles won prior to joining the GAC or by members in sports not sponsored by the GAC.

NAIA

Championships and Postseason

 — national tournament game.

Cross Country

GAC Champions

NCAA Championships Results

Men

Women

Football

GAC Champions

GAC All-Time Standings

NCAA Tournament Results

Bowl Games
The GAC has a tie-in with the Live United Texarkana Bowl in which the highest non-playoff team will receive an automatic selection to the game. The C.H.A.M.P.S. Heart of Texas Bowl began a Division II game in 2012 with the GAC receiving the at-large selection in each of the first four years of the game. The Corsicana Bowl which began in 2017 has a at-large selection option with the GAC.

Men's Soccer

GAC Champions

GAC All-Time Standings

Women's Soccer

GAC Champions

GAC All-Time Standings

NCAA Tournament Results

Volleyball

GAC Champions

GAC All-Time Standings

NCAA Tournament Results

Men's Basketball

GAC Champions

GAC All-Time Standings

NCAA Tournament Results

Women's Basketball

GAC Champions

GAC All-Time Standings

NCAA Tournament Results

Baseball

GAC Champions

GAC All-Time Standings

NCAA Tournament Results

Golf

GAC Champions

NCAA Championships Results

Men

Women

Softball

GAC Champions

GAC All-Time Standings

NCAA Tournament Results

Men's Tennis

GAC Champions

GAC All-Time Standings

NCAA Tournament Results

Women's Tennis

GAC Champions

GAC All-Time Standings

NCAA Tournament Results

Track & Field Outdoor

GAC Champions

See also
2011–12 Great American Conference championships
2012–13 Great American Conference championships

References

External links